Punta del Curull is a mountain of Catalonia, Spain. It has an elevation of 1,021 metres above sea level. It is the highest point of Serra de la Llena.

See also
Mountains of Catalonia

References

Mountains of Catalonia